Since 1985, the Southeast Asian Games have had a mascot in each edition.

See also
 List of Olympic mascots
 List of Asian Games mascots
 List of Commonwealth Games mascots

References 

Southeast Asian Games
Mascots
Lists of mascots